|}

This is a list of electoral region results for the Western Australian Legislative Council in the 1993 Western Australian state election.

Results by Electoral region

Agricultural

East Metropolitan

Mining and Pastoral

North Metropolitan

South Metropolitan

South West

See also 

 Results of the Western Australian state election, 1993 (Legislative Assembly A-L)
 Results of the Western Australian state election, 1993 (Legislative Assembly M-Z)
 1993 Western Australian state election
 Candidates of the Western Australian state election, 1993
 Members of the Western Australian Legislative Council, 1993–1997

References 

Results of Western Australian elections
1993 elections in Australia